Arc is the second studio album by British indie pop band Everything Everything. It was released in the United Kingdom on 14 January 2013, having been preceded by the singles "Cough Cough" and "Kemosabe".

Critical reception

Freddie Holmes of The Underclassed gave the album a positive review, calling it "A masterpiece, a deviation from the norm, and an extraordinary example of music and unquestionable talent; Arc is worth its weight in gold." 7digital featured Arc as album of the week, praising the record as "schizophrenic, electro-pop perfection".

Track listing

Personnel
Jonathan Higgs – vocals, guitar, keyboards
Jeremy Pritchard – bass guitar, keyboards, backing vocals
Alex Robertshaw – guitar, keyboards, backing vocals
Michael Spearman – drums, backing vocals

Charts

References

Everything Everything albums
2013 albums
RCA Records albums